The 2006–07 La Liga season, the 76th since its establishment, started on 27 August 2006 and finished on 17 June 2007. Real Madrid won La Liga on the better head-to-head against Barcelona in one of its most thrilling seasons to date. Celta de Vigo, Real Sociedad and Gimnàstic de Tarragona were relegated.

Barcelona was in first place for much of the season while arch-rivals Real Madrid were six points behind and in fourth. However, Barcelona began playing inconsistently after January, while Madrid's form improved in that same period. On 12 May 2007, Real Madrid took the league lead for the first time all season by defeating Espanyol 4–3, coming back from a 3–1 first-half deficit. The Sunday after Madrid won their epic battle with Espanyol, Barcelona dropped points with a 1–1 draw to struggling Real Betis. By virtue of their superior head-to-head record, Madrid sat at the top of La Liga with both teams having four league games left.

On the penultimate day of the season, Barcelona failed to overcome city rivals Espanyol in the Barcelona derby, drawing 2–2. In the final La Liga matches, Barcelona thrashed Gimnàstic 5–1, but Madrid came back from a 1–0 deficit to beat Mallorca 3–1 and clinch the title on head-to-head superiority.

Teams 
Twenty teams competed in the league – the top seventeen teams from the previous season and the three teams promoted from the Segunda División. The promoted teams were Recreativo, Gimnàstic and Levante, returning to the top flight after an absence of three, fifty-six and one years respectively. They replaced Alaves, Cádiz (both teams relegated after a season's presence) and Málaga (ending their seven-year top flight spell).

Team information

Stadia and locations 

(*) Promoted from Segunda División.

League table

Results

Awards

Pichichi Trophy 
The Pichichi Trophy is awarded to the player who scores the most goals in a season.

Source: LFP

Zamora Trophy 
The Zamora Trophy is awarded to the goalkeeper with fewest goals to games ratio.
Last updated 17 June 2007

Fair Play award 

 Source: Guia As de La Liga 2007–08, p. 140 (sports magazine)

Pedro Zaballa award 
Cuco Ziganda (Osasuna head coach) and David Belenguer (Getafe footballer)

Overall 
 Most wins – Real Madrid CF (23)
 Fewest wins – Gimnàstic (7)
 Most draws – Betis (16)
 Fewest draws – Valencia (6)
 Most losses – Gimnàstic (24)
 Fewest losses – Barcelona (6)
 Most goals scored – Barcelona (78)
 Fewest goals scored – Deportivo La Coruña and Real Sociedad (32)
 Most goals conceded – Gimnàstic (69)
 Fewest goals conceded – Barcelona and Getafe (33)

See also 
 List of transfers of La Liga – 2006-07 season
 2006–07 Segunda División

References

External links 

 
La Liga seasons
1
Spain